Beigbeder is a surname. Notable people with the surname include: 

Charles Beigbeder, French businessman
Frédéric Beigbeder, French writer
Géraldine Beigbeder, French writer
Germán Álvarez Beigbeder (1882-1968), Spanish composer
Juan Luis Beigbeder y Atienza (1888–1957), Spanish politician